Thomas Sergeant Perry (1845–1928) was an American editor, academic, literary critic, literary translator, and literary historian. He was a lifelong friend and associate of Henry James and a member of the faculty at Harvard University.

Early life
Thomas Sergeant Perry was born on January 23, 1845, in Newport, Rhode Island. His parents were Christopher Grant Perry and Frances Sergeant Perry. His paternal grandparents were Commodore Oliver Hazard Perry, brother of Commodore Matthew C. Perry, and Elizabeth Champlin Mason Perry.  His maternal grandparents were Thomas Sergeant, a judge of the supreme court of Pennsylvania, and Sarah Bache Sergeant. His father's family line goes back to Edward Perry and Mary Freeman Perry who lived in Plymouth, Massachusetts, in 1635. On his mother's side, one of his ancestors is Benjamin Franklin; Perry was his great-great-grandson.

He was a childhood friend of Henry James, with whom he attended Reverend W.C. Leverett's school in Newport, Rhode Island, before the Civil War. Perry met John La Farge, who later married his sister Margaret, through James.

Perry earned his Bachelor's degree from Harvard University in 1866 and his Masters in 1869. He studied in Paris and Berlin between 1866 and 1868.

Career
Between 1868 and 1872, he was a tutor in German at Harvard. He was an English instructor in English for 1877 to 1881 and an English literature lecturer from 1881 to 82. In 1898, he became professor of English literature in the Keio University, in Tokyo, Japan.

He was a prolific essayist, writing on a wide variety of authors, including Alfred de Musset, Arthur Hugh Clough, Berthold Auerbach, Fritz Reuter, George Sand, Ivan Turgenev, Mark Twain, Edward Fitzgerald, Sir Walter Scott, Victor Cherbuliez, Victor Hugo, William Blake, and William Dean Howells, for a variety of American literary publications, including North American Review and The Century.

Edwin Arlington Robinson dedicated his book of poetry, The Three Taverns, to Lilla and Thomas Perry.

Personal life
On April 9, 1874, he married Lilla Cabot, an American painter who was an important figure in Impressionism in the United States. The couple had three daughters:

 Margaret Perry (b. 1876)
 Edith Perry (b. 1880)
 Alice Perry (b. 1884), who married Joseph Clark Grew (1880–1965), the Under Secretary of State, and later, the U.S. Ambassador to Japan during the December 7, 1941, attack on Pearl Harbor

Thomas Sergeant Perry died on May 7, 1928, after having been sick with pneumonia.

Works
His published works include:

Editor
 North American Review, 1872-74
 Life and Letters of Francis Lieber, 1882
 English Literature in the Eighteenth Century, 1873

Author
 
 
 
 
 
 
 
 
 

Translator
He also made translations from French and German.

References

Further reading

External links
 
 

1845 births
1928 deaths
Harvard University faculty
American literary editors
19th-century American writers
Writers from Newport, Rhode Island
Harvard University alumni
19th-century American translators
Perry family
Members of the American Academy of Arts and Letters